In aviation, cross-controlled flight refers to a state of uncoordinated flight where the aircraft's rudder and ailerons are working in opposite directions. Crossed controls are most commonly used in slips. Having crossed controls, as in any form of uncoordinated flight, is aerodynamically unsound and if not monitored closely by the pilot can result in a stall or a spin.

References

External Links
 Private Pilot Maneuvers. Jeppesen Sanderson, 1997.
 Cross-Coordinated, www.aviationsafetymagazine.com, April 2006

Aircraft operations